Pall may refer to:

 Pall (funeral), a cloth used to cover a coffin
 Pall (heraldry), a Y-shaped heraldic charge
 Pall (liturgy), a piece of stiffened linen used to cover the chalice at the Eucharist
 Pall Corporation, a global business
 Pall., author abbreviation of German naturalist Peter Simon Pallas
 Pallium, a vestment pertaining to an archbishop
 Pall (name)
 Páll, name

See also
 Pail, a bucket
 Pale (disambiguation)
 Pall Mall (disambiguation)
 PAL (disambiguation)